Sean Patrick Mulligan (born April 25, 1970 in Lynwood, California) is an American former professional baseball player. He was famously traded away from San Diego in exchange for $50,000 and a treadmill.

Mulligan played college baseball at Illinois.

External links

1970 births
Living people
Akron Aeros players
American expatriate baseball players in Canada
Baseball players from California
Bridgeport Bluefish players
Camden Riversharks players
Charleston Rainbows players
Duluth-Superior Dukes players
American expatriate baseball players in Italy
High Desert Mavericks players
Illinois Fighting Illini baseball players
Las Vegas Stars (baseball) players
Ottawa Lynx players
Parma Baseball Club players
People from Lynwood, California
Rancho Cucamonga Quakes players
Rochester Red Wings players
San Diego Padres players
Somerset Patriots players
St. Paul Saints players
Waterloo Diamonds players
Wichita Wranglers players
Bowie Baysox players
Cafeteros de Córdoba players
American expatriate baseball players in Mexico
Mercuries Tigers players
American expatriate baseball players in Taiwan